Fraxinus baroniana is a species of ash tree native to China, where it is found in Gansu, Shaanxi and Sichuan provinces.

References

baroniana
Plants described in 1905